Clare College is a constituent college of the University of Cambridge in Cambridge, England. The college was founded in 1326 as University Hall, making it the second-oldest surviving college of the University after Peterhouse. It was refounded in 1338 as Clare Hall by an endowment from Elizabeth de Clare, and took on its current name in 1856. Clare is famous for its chapel choir and for its gardens on "The Backs" (the back of the colleges that overlook the River Cam).

Clare is consistently one of the most popular Cambridge colleges amongst prospective applicants.

History
The college was founded in 1326 by the university's Chancellor, Richard Badew, and was originally named University Hall. Providing maintenance for only two fellows, it soon hit financial hardship. In 1338, the college was refounded as Clare Hall by an endowment from Elizabeth de Clare, a granddaughter of Edward I, which provided for twenty fellows and ten students.

The college was known as Clare Hall until 1856, when it changed its name to "Clare College". (A new "Clare Hall" was founded by Clare College as an exclusively postgraduate institution in 1966.)

Buildings

Old Court

Clare's Old Court, a Grade I listed building, frames King's College Chapel as the left border of one of the most celebrated architectural vistas in England. It was built between 1638 and 1715, with a long interruption for the English Civil War. The period spans the arrival of true classicism into the mainstream of British architecture, such that its progress can be traced in the marked differences between the oldest wing to the north, which still has vaulting and other features in the unbroken tradition of English Gothic, and the final southern block, which shows a fully articulated classic style.

The college's chapel was built in 1763 and designed by Sir James Burrough, the Master of neighbouring Caius College. Its altarpiece is Annunciation by Cipriani.

Clare Bridge
Clare has a much-photographed bridge over the River Cam and is the oldest of Cambridge's current bridges. It was built of stone in 1640 by Thomas Grumbold and restored in 1969, and is a Grade I listed building.

Fourteen stone balls decorate it, one of which has a missing section. A number of apocryphal stories circulate concerning this – the one most commonly cited by members of college is that the original builder of the bridge was not paid the full amount for his work and so removed the segment to balance the difference in payment. A more likely explanation is that a wedge of stone cemented into the ball as part of a repair job became loose and fell out.

Memorial Court

Clare's bridge connects Old Court to Memorial Court, which was designed by Giles Gilbert Scott and dedicated in 1926. Memorial Court was extended in the 1950s by the construction of Thirkill Court, and was later divided into two parts when the College's Forbes Mellon Library was constructed in the centre of Memorial Court; the new courtyard created in the west was renamed Ashby Court.

Lerner Court

A new court, Lerner Court, designed by architects van Heyningen and Haward, was opened in January 2008. It occupies the last piece of undeveloped land in the central area of the College next to Memorial Court and houses a lecture theatre, catering, fellows offices, residential accommodation and a student laundry.

Gallery

Student life
Clare is known as a liberal and progressive college. In 1972 it became one of the three male Cambridge colleges that led the way in admitting female undergraduates (the other two being Churchill and King's). Clare continues in this tradition and has won praise for the transparency of its admissions process.

Clare is known as one of the most musical colleges in Cambridge. Its choir has performed all over the world. Many Clare students play instruments, and the Clare College Music Society is well known, particularly the orchestra. Like most Cambridge colleges, Clare allows students to have a piano in their college rooms.

Clare Ents
As well as popular jazz and comedy nights, Clare is renowned for Clare Ents, a student night held every Friday in term time. The night is popular with students across the university and in the past it has hosted such acts as Tinie Tempah, Bombay Bicycle Club and Chase and Status.

Clareification
Clare's student newspaper, Clareification, won "Best University College Paper" in The Cambridge Student in 2005. Published by the Union of Clare Students, it comprises satirical articles mocking Cambridge traditions, reports on silly student antics, and college gossip in the "Clareifornication" column.

On 3 February 2007 the college cut its funding to the paper following the publication of the guest-edited edition of 2 February, retitled Crucification. In addition to the paper's usual satirical attacks on Christianity, this edition also featured several articles which mocked Islam, and a reproduction of the cartoon illustrations of the prophet Mohammed which provoked international protest when they first appeared in Danish newspaper Jyllands-Posten in September 2005.May Ball

Clare holds an annual May ball on the Monday of May Week in the middle of June. It is one of the largest may balls in Cambridge and is well known for securing popular headliners.

Clare Boat Club
Clare Boat Club is the rowing club for current members of Clare College. There is a separate club, De Burgh Boat Club, for alumni. In 2012, Clare Boat Club had the highest membership relative to the size of its student body of any college-affiliated boat club in Cambridge, fielding six men's VIIIs in the May Bumps competition.

The club's Head Coach and Boathouse Manager, Anton Wright, appeared on Channel 4's year-long reality TV show, Eden.

Old Court Panorama

Academic performance
The undergraduates of Clare College have usually performed very well based on the results published in the Tompkins Table, placing Clare within the top ten colleges from 2000 to 2005. However, their performance in the following years (2006–09) was poorer, leaving them in 12th in 2006 and 18th in 2009. Their 2010 performance (8th position) however showed an increase of 10 places over their previous year's performance, and in 2011 they reached fourth place.  In 2018, Clare placed 16th out of 29 colleges recorded in the table. In 2019, it fell to 24th place. In 2022, it rose to 12th place.

Entrance into Clare College is competitive. Overall, Clare has approximately five applicants per place. Yet the high quality of applicants means that many of them are awarded places at other colleges through the Winter Pool. Of applicants in 2007, 151 were given offers by Clare, and a further 75 applicants were made offers at other Cambridge colleges.

People associated with Clare College

See also
 A Clare Benediction''
 :Category:Alumni of Clare College, Cambridge
 :Category:Fellows of Clare College, Cambridge

References

External links

Clare College, Cambridge official website
Union of Clare Students (JCR) website
Clare MCR website

 
Colleges of the University of Cambridge
Educational institutions established in the 14th century
Grade I listed buildings in Cambridge
Grade I listed educational buildings
1326 establishments in England